Kale District (also called Kalemyo District) is the westernmost district in Sagaing Division of Myanmar (Burma).

Townships

Its administrative center is the city of Kalay (Kalaymyo). The district consists of three townships;
 Kale Township
 Kalewa Township
Mingin Township

Borders
To the west Kale District borders Falam District in Chin State, to the north Mawlaik District, to the east Shwebo District, to the south Monywa District and finally Gangaw District of Magway Division.

Economy
The area is supported by rice farming, fisheries and timbering. The main towns are Kalaymyo, Kalewa and Mingin.

Religion

Kale District is one of the most affluent Christian areas of Burma. 99% of inhabitants in Tahan are Christian even though Burma is a Buddhist country and 90% of the national population are Buddhist. Only 4% of the Burmese population are Christian. Kale has 116 Buddhist Monasteries, 508 Churches, a Mosque, two Hindu Temples, two Buddhist Seminary for Nuns, five Buddhist nunneries and a joss house (Chinese communal temple). There are over 50 churches in Tahan also. This is the only place in Burma that you can see a church on every street corner and where Christmas is celebrated.

References

External links
Maplandia.com: "Kale Google Satellite Map and Gazetteer" 

 
Sagaing Region
Districts of Myanmar